The 1986 Head Cup, also known as the 1986 Austrian Open Kitzbühel, was a men's tennis tournament played on outdoor clay courts that was part of the 1986 Nabisco Grand Prix. It was the 16th edition of the tournament and took place at the Tennis stadium Kitzbühel in Kitzbühel, Austria, from 4 August until 10 August 1986. Sixth-seeded Miloslav Mečíř, who entered the main draw on a wildcard, won the singles title.

Finals

Singles
 Miloslav Mečíř defeated  Andrés Gómez, 6–4, 4–6, 6–1, 2–6, 6–3
 It was Mečíř's only singles title of the year and the 3rd of his career.

Doubles
 Heinz Günthardt /  Tomáš Šmíd defeated  Hans Gildemeister /  Andrés Gómez, 4–6, 6–3, 7–6

References

External links
 ITF tournament edition details

Austrian Open
Austrian Open Kitzbühel
Austrian Open